Dimitrios Vosnakidis (born 14 February 1994) is a Greek professional footballer who plays as a centre-back.

Career
After starting his youth career at Panthrakikos, Vosnakidis moved to Italy, joining Serie B side Bari in October 2012.

He then progressed through the youth side, and played his first match as a professional on 23 August 2013, coming on as a late substitute in a 0–0 draw at Reggina.

References

External links

sports.ert.gr

1994 births
Living people
Greek footballers
Association football defenders
Panthrakikos F.C. players
Iraklis Thessaloniki F.C. players
Serie B players
S.S.C. Bari players
Greek expatriate footballers
Greek expatriate sportspeople in Italy
Expatriate footballers in Italy
Greece youth international footballers
Footballers from Komotini